Freundschaft siegt (We are for Peace!) is an East German film about the 3rd World Festival of Youth and Students held in Berlin in 1951. It was directed by Dutch filmmaker Joris Ivens and Soviet filmmaker Ivan Pyryev, and released in 1952.

External links
 

1952 films
East German films
1950s German-language films
German black-and-white films
1952 documentary films
1950s German films